This is a list of properties and districts in Dooly County, Georgia that are listed on the National Register of Historic Places (NRHP).

Current listings

|}

References

Dooly
Buildings and structures in Dooly County, Georgia